HXD2B locomotives are railway locomotives designed for heavy freight mainline work. The design is a single body twin cab locomotive with 6 axles in Co′Co′ wheel arrangement.  The body frame, traction motor power electronics and driver facilities are of a similar design as the HXD2. The bogie design differs from the HXD2 using a straight welded steel frame rather than the 'mouth' shaped form used in the HXD2.

An order worth €1.2billion (25% Alstom, 75% Datong) for 500 units was made in 2006. The first 100 units were to be built primarily by Alstom, this number was reduced in 2007 to 10 units.  The first Chinese-built unit was produced in December 2009. The order is expected to be complete by 2012.

See also
 China Railways 8K,  twin-unit locomotives produced by Alstom for China in the 1980s. see also 8K locomotive (Chinese language)
 List of locomotives in China

References

External links

Electric locomotives of China
CNR Datong Electric Locomotive Co. locomotives
Alstom Prima electric locomotives
25 kV AC locomotives
Standard gauge locomotives of China
Co′Co′ locomotives
Co-Co locomotives